Marinus Arnoldus Johannes Snoeren (October 16, 1919 – July 11, 1982), was a Dutch cellist who was called the "aristocrat of cellists," on account of his elegant musicianship and majestic sound. He was born in The Hague, the son of Marinus Franciscus Snoeren.

As a pedagogue he was most noticeable for his student Anner Bylsma.
Marinus was a teacher at the Leidsche Muziek School in Leiden. He made his first tour of the United States in 1963 and played to great acclaim in the orchestra  undertaking several major tours which included cities such as New York City, Boston, Chicago, Vienna, Munich and Berlin. He has performed under great conductors including Leonard Bernstein, Pierre Boulez, Hans Knappertsbusch. Later he was the principal cellist for six years in the Residentie Orchestra in The Hague. He played the various cello concertos under Jean Martinon. His eldest son became a conductor/composer performing under the name of Rien Snoeren.

Discography 
 Only known recordings are Suites of Bach held in the family records.

References 

1919 births
1982 deaths
Deaths from cancer in the Netherlands
Dutch cellists
Dutch music educators
Grand Officiers of the Légion d'honneur
Honorary Members of the Royal Academy of Music
Musicians from The Hague
20th-century cellists